John MacMurray (1958–2006) was a Canadian musician.

John MacMurray or John Macmurray may also refer to:

John Van Antwerp MacMurray (1881–1960), American attorney and diplomat
John Macmurray (1891–1976), Scottish philosopher

See also
Webb Wilder, American musician, born John Webb McMurry